The South Superior Union Hall was built in 1921 in the southern part of what is now Superior, Wyoming. The hall was built by six locals of the United Mine Workers to accommodate union and community activities in the coal-mining community of Superior. Built in 1921, the two-story brick hall's plan is a parallelogram, though to be unique for its time in Wyoming. The hall housed doctors' and dentists' offices, a bowling alley and a grocery store.  Dances were held in the upstairs meeting space.. With the closing of the Superior mines in the 1960s the union hall was sold in 1964. The hall was converted to a cafe, but the business did not prosper and the hall was abandoned.

The South Superior Union Hall has been restored and is the center of an interpretive park.

The South Superior Union Hall was added to the National Register of Historic Places in 1983.

References

External links
South Superior Union Hall at the Wyoming State Historic Preservation Office

Clubhouses on the National Register of Historic Places in Wyoming
Buildings and structures completed in 1920
Buildings and structures in Sweetwater County, Wyoming
United Mine Workers of America
Historic American Buildings Survey in Wyoming
National Register of Historic Places in Sweetwater County, Wyoming
Trade union buildings in the United States